Santiago González and Scott Lipsky were the defending champions, but lost in the first round to Denis Kudla and Michael Russell.
Nicolas Mahut and Édouard Roger-Vasselin won the title, defeating Tim Smyczek and Rhyne Williams, 6–7(4–7), 6–2, [10–5].

Seeds

Draw

Draw

References
 Main Draw

Hall of Fame Tennis Championships - Doubles